is a Japanese female professional wrestler. She has held the WWWA World Single Championship three times, and is the first woman to win a men's title in Japan. 

Inoue performed in the World Wrestling Federation at Survivor Series 1995 in an all-women's Survivor Series elimination match that included WWF Women's Champion Alundra Blayze, Bertha Faye and Aja Kong.

She is also the founder of the joshi promotion NEO Japan Ladies Pro-Wrestling. After leaving NEO in May 2010, Inoue founded the World Woman Pro-Wrestling Diana promotion in January 2011. Kyoko Inoue was trained by famous Japanese wrestler, Jaguar Yokota.

Professional wrestling career

World Wrestling Federation (1994; 1995) 
On May 11, 1994, Inoue made her first appearance on World Wrestling Federation (WWF) during a live event in Japan, where she unsuccessfully challenged Alundra Blayze for the WWF Women's Championship. On November 19, 1995, at Survivor Series, Inoue joined the team of Blayze in the traditional Survivor Series elimination match, Where Blayze's team lost, as Aja Kong remained the sole survivor of the opponent team. On the November 27th episode of Monday Night Raw, Inoue alongside Blayze lost to Kong and Tomoko Watanabe.

Championships and accomplishments
All Japan Women's Pro-Wrestling
AJW Championship (1 time)
All Pacific Championship (2 times)
IWA World Women's Championship (2 times)
WWWA World Single Championship (3 times)
WWWA World Tag Team Championship (4 times) – with Takako Inoue
Japan Grand Prix (1991)
Tag League the Best (1991) – with Toshiyo Yamada
Tag League the Best (1992) – with Aja Kong
Tag League the Best (1995) – with Tomoko Watanabe
Dramatic Dream Team
Ironman Heavymetalweight Championship (2 times)
JDStar
TWF World Women's Championship (2 times)
NEO Japan Ladies Pro-Wrestling
NEO Tag Team Championship (1 time) - with Hiroyo Matsumoto
NWA Women's Pacific/NEO Single Championship (3 times)
NEO Mid-Summer Tag Tournament 7 (2008) - with Hiroyo Matsumoto
 Tokyo Sports
 Joshi Puroresu Grand Prize (1996)
World Entertainment Wrestling
WEW 6-Man Tag Team Championship (2 times) – with Kodo Fuyuki and Chocoball Mukai
WEW Tag Team Championship (1 time) – with Hiromichi Fuyuki
World Woman Pro-Wrestling Diana
WWWD Queen Championship/WWWD World Single Championship (4 times)
WWWD World Tag Team Championship (2 times) – with Tomoko Watanabe (1) and Yumiko Hotta (1)
Queen Championship Tournament (2013)
Wrestling Observer Newsletter awards
Match of the Year (1995) vs. Manami Toyota on May 7

References

External links
 Championships taken from wrestling-titles.com
 

1969 births
20th-century professional wrestlers
21st-century professional wrestlers
Japanese female professional wrestlers
Professional wrestling executives
Living people
People from Yamagata Prefecture
Ironman Heavymetalweight Champions